The Men's 1500 metre freestyle competition of the 2018 European Aquatics Championships was held on 4 and 5 August 2018.

Records
Before the competition, the existing world and championship records were as follows.

Results

Heats
The heats were started on 4 August at 10:49.

Final
The final was held on 5 August at 17:00.

References

Men's 1500 metre freestyle